Lisa Müller (born 23 November 1989) is a German sport shooter.

She participated at the 2018 ISSF World Shooting Championships, winning a medal.

References

External links

Living people
1992 births
German female sport shooters
ISSF rifle shooters
European Games competitors for Germany
Shooters at the 2015 European Games
21st-century German women